Transcendence is the seventeenth studio album by Canadian musician Devin Townsend. It is the seventh and final album in the Devin Townsend Project series. It was released on September 9, 2016, via HevyDevy Records.

Background
Transcendence is the first Devin Townsend album not to be produced solely by Townsend, by featuring ex-Periphery member Adam "Nolly" Getgood as additional producer, engineer and mixer. By Townsend's request, the other musicians' input to songs, arrangements and production is also greater than on previous Devin Townsend albums.

The first song on the album, "Truth", is a re-recorded version of a song that appeared for the first time on Devin Townsend's solo album Infinity, while the bonus disc includes a re-recording of the song "Victim", from Physicist. The song "Stars" was publicly demoed during a live stream sponsored by Toontrack. The album also includes a cover of Ween's song "Transdermal Celebration" from the album quebec.

The album entered the UK official charts at number 26 on September 16, 2016, after entering the mid-week update chart at 16.

Track listing

Sources:

Personnel
Devin Townsend Project
 Devin Townsend – guitars, vocals, bass, keyboards, programming
 Dave Young – guitars, keyboards
 Brian Waddell – bass
 Ryan Van Poederooyen – drums
 Mike St-Jean – keyboards

Additional personnel
 Anneke van Giersbergen – vocals
 Ché Aimee Dorval - vocals

Other staff
 Devin Townsend – production
 Adam "Nolly" Getgood – additional production, engineering
 Ermin Hamidovic - mastering
 Anthony Clarkson – cover art

Charts

References

2016 albums
Devin Townsend albums
Albums produced by Devin Townsend